Zhang Guifang (Chinese: 张桂芳; Pinyin: Zhāng Guìfāng) is a fictional character featured within the famed classic Chinese novel Investiture of the Gods.

Background 
Zhang Guifang is the commander of Green Dragon Pass and serves under Grand Old Master Wen Zhong like an iron sword. In appearance, Zhang wears bulky white royal armor and wields a large ice spear. Due to Zhang's original status, he wields the magical ability "name call"; with this ability, Zhang could paralyze any individual if he happens to say their true name (such an ability is impossible to use on Superiormen however).

Following the trickery of Chao Lei, Wen Zhong would send Zhang and his vanguard Feng Lin to the Western Foothills on a punitive campaign. Following Zhang's arrival, he would try to convince Jiang Ziya to "see the light" and return to King Zhou. Shortly following this, a major battle would ensue between Zhang and his army. While personally dueling against Huang Feihu, he would shout the words, "Huang Feihu, get down from your beast!" Thus, Zhang captured Huang and returned to camp.

Later on, Nezha would confront Zhang around two days following the previous conflict with Jiang Ziya. Nezha would use his divine renown to easily smash through Zhang's unit of a thousand troops and even destroy Zhang's right arm with a crucial attack. However, Wang Magus would later heal Zhang's wounds, effectively allowing him to return again in battle. Following the desperate actions of Li Resounding, Zhang would immediately appear and rescue him from trouble. However, Zhang himself would be forced to flee. At the time of night, Jiang Ziya would send the Chao Twins and Heavenly Happiness before Zhang's camp. After declaring his eternal allegiance to King Zhou, Zhang would commit suicide by impaling himself with his sword.

Zhang Guifang was appointed as the deity of Sangmenxing (丧门星) in the end.

Notes

References
 Investiture of the Gods chapter 36

Chinese gods
Investiture of the Gods characters